Chris Seeman (born 1967) is a professor of theology and role-playing game author.

Education and teaching
Professor Seeman holds a Ph.D. in Near Eastern Religions from the University of California at Berkeley. B.A., University of San Francisco. M.A., Graduate Theological Union .

He teaches Theology courses at Walsh University in North Canton, Ohio.

Tolkien and role-playing games
Chris Seeman began publishing the Middle-earth Role Playing fanzine Other Hands in 1993. Jessica Ney-Grimm of Iron Crown Enterprises (ICE) contributed MERP content to Other Hands, and Seeman later became an assistant line editor on the game for ICE. Chris Seeman and Matt Forbeck both did some work on The Lord of the Rings Roleplaying Game for Decipher, Inc.

In 1992 he established  Other Hands Magazine: The International Journal of Middle-earth Gaming, which he published on a quarterly basis until 2001.

He has also been co-editor and author for The Guild Companion eZine and many content submissions there.

He created and manages a website called "The Tolkien Music List" at  www.tolkien-music.com.

MERP
  (1995)
 Southern Gondor: The Land -  (1996)
  (1996)
  (1997)
  (1997)
  (1997)
  (1997)

Decipher LotR RPG
  (2003)
  (2003)

References
 http://www.merpcon.com/merpcon-guest-speakers-biographies/edit MerpCon Guest Speakers Biographies,
 https://web.archive.org/web/20070223101938/http://www.merp.com/essays/aboutchrisseeman Merp.com version of Chris Seeman biography. used with permission of original author.
 http://www.roliste.com/bio.jsp?id=581  Roliste.com Biographie : Chris Seeman (in French).

External links
 Other Hands Magazine, archived at Other Minds Magazine 
 Iron Crown Enterprises
 Tolkien Music list

1967 births
American publishers (people)
Living people
Tolkien fandom